Film censorship in the Republic of Ireland began on a national basis with the introduction of the Censorship of Films Act in 1923. This act established the office of the Censor of Films, an office since replaced and renamed in 2008 as the Irish Film Classification Office.

Approach
During the early and mid-20th century, the original Film Censors Office heavily cut films and videos for rental release, or placed high age ratings on them. Figures released by the Film Censors Office state that 2,500 films received theatrical performance bans, and over 11,000 films were cut, between the 1920s and 1980s. Films previously banned in Ireland have included Scarface (1932), A Clockwork Orange (1971), and Monty Python's Life of Brian (1979).

Since the release of Michael Collins in 1996, which was initially rated PG despite its depictions of strong violence, the censor's office has generally applied age ratings and has not requested cuts to films. Former head censor Sheamus Smith (who held the position between 1986 and 2002) banned several but never cut them as his predecessors did, despite frequent requests from distributors to secure lower certificates and wider audiences. Smith wasn't fond of his official 'Film Censor' title as he felt that the term was emotive and implied someone who "butchers or bans movies". Smith believed that a director's vision should remain intact regardless of the certificate and that "it's an arrogance for a censor or classifier to be cutting up and changing it".

Current director Ger Connolly follows the same policy, although one instance of cutting involving previous censor John Kelleher exists, regarding Korean horror film The Isle. He didn't force censorship upon the film's distributor, but didn't immediately grant a certificate after viewing it on 8 September (just two days before its original release date) and "drew attention to scenes of sexual violence and explicit self-mutilation that were causing us concern". He gave them two options – either they could resubmit it for a second viewing/re-assessment or submit a censored version to secure a certificate. The distributor, Tartan, went with the latter, removing 3m 15s on top of 1m 50s already removed by the BBFC showing animal cruelty, specifically shots of a drowning bird and mutilated fish, which earned them an 18 certificate on 29 September – the changes weren't legally required but sped up the release process.

Legislation 
The main legislation under which Irish films are rated and censored include:
 The Censorship of Films Act, 1923 was an act "to provide for the official censoring of cinematographic pictures and for other matters connected therewith".  It established the office of the Official Censor of Films and a Censorship of Films Appeal Board (see William Magennis) and that no film be exhibited in public without a certificate.
 The Censorship of Films Act, 1923 was amended by the Censorship of Films (Amendment) Act, 1925, in connection with advertisements for films.  It was amended by the Censorship of Films (Amendment) Act, 1930 to extend the legislation to "vocal or other sounds" accompanying pictures.
 The Emergency Powers Act 1939 dealt with the preservation of the State in time of war and contained provisions relating to the censorship of communications, including mail, newspapers and periodicals.
 The Censorship of Films (Amendment) Act 1970 allowed films to be resubmitted for certification seven years after being rejected.
 The Video Recordings Act, 1989 adds video/DVD recordings to the Film Censor's responsibility to examine. A different classification can be given than the same feature film was give but the censor cannot refuse to grant a certificate for a video if a certificate is in force for the same feature film.

Notable banned or cut films 
While a number of films were formerly banned or cut by the Film Censor's Office, a review in 2000 meant that many of these have since been un-banned and rated anywhere from G to 18. During that review process it was decided that no more films would be banned for either cinema or video release, but some bans are still in place.

Prior to the Video Recordings Act 1989, many films which were banned in the cinema were freely available on video tape to anyone in Ireland regardless of age.

A notable recent ban was that of Boy Eats Girl in 2005, a film starring Irish actress Samantha Mumba, due its graphic depiction of a suicide attempt. Following an appeal, it was passed uncut with a 15A rating, far from the highest possible.

The listed year refers to when the film was banned by the Office, not necessarily the original release date.

{| class="wikitable sortable"
|-
! Date
! Title
! class="unsortable" | Notes
! Post-ban/current certificate
|-
| 1927
| The Unknown
| Banned on 27 August for its cruel sensationalism and semi-nudity of the heroine. As with Frankenstein, the unrestricted General certificate caused concern for 'youngsters and nervous adults'.

The Appeal Board upheld the rejection in the same year, though no specific date is available.
|
|-
| 1931
| Dracula
| Passed with proposed cuts on 5 June, with a request for the distributor to "delete some of the horrors and re-show the film".
| PG
|-
| 1932
| Monkey Business
| Banned because censors feared it would encourage anarchic tendencies. Passed on 8 January with '16 unspecified cuts to script', including characters falling over each other in a dance scene.
| G
|-
| 1932
| Frankenstein
| Banned on 5 February for being demoralising & unsuitable for children or 'nervous people' – age-restricted certificates weren't introduced until 1965.

Overturned by the Appeal Board on 8 March and given a certificate on 9 March (uncut).
| G (1932)
PG (video)
|-
| 1932
| Scarface
| Banned on 19 August. Upheld by the Films Appeal Board on 30 September.

Banned on 29 August 1941 (under the alternate title of 'Gang War'). Upheld by the Films Appeal Board on 7 October.

Banned on 24 April 1953 (under the original title). No appeal was lodged.

Various reasons include pandering to sensationalism, glamorizing the gangster lifestyle and implying an incestuous relationship between the protagonist and his sister.
|PG
|-
| 1942
| Fantasia
| Initially cut on 30 April. Dr. Richard Hayes (Film Censor from October 1940 to January 1954) cut the scientific talk which introduces the 'Rite of Spring' section, stating that it 'gave an entirely materialistic view of the origin of life' – it's since been reinstated.
| G
|-
| 1942
|  A Day in Soviet Russia
|Passed with "extensive cuts under the EPO" (for infringing on wartime neutrality) on 2 June 1942.

The documentary was advertised to open on a Sunday but the certificate was withdrawn on Saturday afternoon.
|
|-
| 1943
|  Casablanca
|Banned on 19 March for infringing on the Emergency Powers Order preserving wartime neutrality, by portraying Vichy France and Nazi Germany in a "sinister light".

Passed with cuts on 15 June 1945 after the EPO was lifted – this time the cuts were to dialogue between Rick and Ilsa referring to their love affair.

Passed with one cut on 16 July 1974. RTÉ inquired about showing the film on TV – it still required a dialogue cut to Ilsa expressing her love for Rick.

All releases since are uncut.
|G
|-
| 1943
|  A Yank in the RAF
|Passed with 30 cuts on 10 August due to the EPO. It was passed on 27 July 1945 after the EPO was lifted, this time with only 5 cuts. The certificate was withdrawn after one week's run at the Savoy Cinema in September after 41,000 had seen the film.
| G
|-
| 1943
|  The Outlaw
| Banned due to sexual references.
|
|-
| 1945
|  Mildred Pierce
|
|PG
|-
| 1945
|  Brief Encounter
|  Initially banned as it was considered too permissive of adultery – ban lifted
| PG
|-
| 1946
| The Big Sleep
| Initially banned because of its sexual references – ban lifted.
|PG
|-
| 1950
|  Outrage
|Banned due to its rape theme.
|
|-
| 1966
|  Pasażerka
|Initially banned and described by the censor as a "horror film" – he also objected to a scene showing naked women being driven to the camp. Overturned by the Films Appeal Board without cuts.
|16
|-
| 1967
|  Ulysses
|Based on the book by James Joyce, it was banned for being "subversive to public morality", upheld by the Films Appeal Board and banned for a second time in 1975 – ban lifted in September 2000 at director Joseph Strick's's request, although it was screened at the Irish Film Theatre (a private club cinema) in the late 1970s.

The first public screening was held in February 2001, with then-censor Sheamus Smith and Strick both in attendance. It went on general release at the IFI from 8 February 2001.
| 15
|-
| 1973
|  Everything You Always Wanted to Know About Sex
| Banned on 20 March. A cut version was passed in 1979 and released theatrically in 1980, removing both a bestiality reference ("the greatest lay I ever had", referring to a sheep) and a man having sex with a bread loaf – ban/censorship lifted.
| 18<ref>{{cite web|url=https://i.ebayimg.com/images/g/nOIAAOSwcN9e8Dll/s-l1600.jpg|title=Photograph of DVD jacket for Photograph of DVD jacket for Everything You Always Wanted to Know About Sex * But Were Afraid to Ask|via=eBay}}</ref>
|-
| 1973
|  A Clockwork Orange| Banned on 10 April – Warner Bros. decided against appealing due to the film causing public controversy. Passed uncut for cinema on 13 December 1999 and released on 17 March 2000.

The re-release poster was rejected due to the words "ultra-violence" and "rape" in the tagline (it's a replica of the original British version). Sheamus Smith explained his rejection to the Irish Times; "I believe that the use of those words in the context of advertising would be offensive and inappropriate".
| 18
|-
| 1980
|  Monty Python's Life of Brian| Banned on 29 April. Overturned by the Films Appeal Board on 7 August 1987.
| 18 (1987)
15 (video re-rating)https://discogslabs.imgix.net/films/5ec429a1b81ffd9682c56ac2.jpeg?auto=compress%2Cformat&blur=0&ch=Width%2CDPR%2CViewport-Width&dpr=2&fit=max&fm=jpg&h=2000&w=2000&s=8de13c7b7b71584f2e3bfb9bec54377f 
|-
| 1980
|  Zombie Flesh Eaters| Banned on 14 October. Overturned by the Films Appeal Board on 31 October.

Re-banned for video in 1994 as prohibition order #702 and passed in 2012.
| 18 (very strong & gory violence – 2012)
|-
| 1981
|  Last Tango in Paris| Ban lifted.
| 18
|-
| 1982
|  Porky's| Banned on 1 February. Overturned by the Film Appeals Board on 19 February.
|16 (theatrical)
18 (video)
|-
| 1982
|  Richard Pryor: Live on the Sunset Strip| Banned on 23 July. Released on DVD in 2006.
| 18
|-
| 1982
|  Fast Times at Ridgemont High| Banned on 8 October. Overturned by the Film Appeals Board on 29 October with cuts. Uncut on home video.
| 18
|-
| 1982
|  Monsignor| Banned on 29 November due to its conflation of religion and adultery, as it features an affair between a priest and a postulant nun. Overturned by the Film Appeals Board on 17 December.

The decision caused controversy among members of Fianna Fáil – chairman Ned Brennan believed the majority of the Irish public didn't want it to be released and said "standards must be maintained", wanting it banned on "moral grounds".
| 16
|-
| 1983
|  Monty Python's The Meaning of Life|Banned on 27 June (lifted in 1990).
| 15
|-
| 1984
|  Cannibal Holocaust| Ban lifted in 2006.
| 18
|-
| 1985
|  Crimes of Passion| Banned on 18 November. Released on DVD in 2008.
| 18
|-
| 1986
|  Working Girls| Banned on 12 August. Upheld by the Film Appeals Board on 28 September.
|
|-
| 1987
|  Personal Services| Banned on 13 March. Overturned by the Film Appeals Board on 12 May.
| 18
|-
| 1989
|  Meet the Feebles| Still banned, as of 2009.
|
|-
| 1991
|  Whore| Banned on 9 August. Upheld by the Films Appeal Board on 20 September, although an earlier appeal meeting held on 28 August failed to come to a decision.

This all postponed the Irish home release, due on the week of the failed appeal with 2,000 copies. The video distributor (National Cable Vision) submitted a tape to Smith for a reconsideration on home media, where it had the unfortunate honor of being the first ever banned video - new legislation providing that power had been passed in July.
|
|-
| 1991
|  The Texas Chain Saw Massacre| Banned for video as prohibition order #3 - revoked on 2 September 1999 with an 18 certificate.
|18 (strong horror and bloody violence - 2013)
|-
| 1993
|  Bad Lieutenant| Banned on 29 January due to its "demeaning treatment of women", which was upheld by the Film Appeals Board on 18 February.

Re-banned on 1 April 2003 for video.
|
|-
| 1994
|  Natural Born Killers| Banned on 11 October because Sheamus Smith was concerned about "copycat" killings linked to the film. This reasoning was accepted by the Films Appeal Board and the ban upheld on 20 January 1995 – revoked on 1 May 2001.
|18
|-
|1994
|  Dangerous Game| Banned for video, most likely due to a violent rape scene. The cinema distributors (Abbey Films) never submitted it for an Irish theatrical release. Polygram appealed the decision – the viewing took place on 23 November, where the ban was upheld.
|
|-
| 1994
|  I Spit on Your Grave| Banned on video four times, in 1994 (prohibition order #701), 2000, 5 February 2002 and 14 September 2010 (#1 the latter times).
|
|-
|1995
|  Showgirls| Banned on 8 November – no reason was given but speculation pointed towards the rape scene, which was initially cut in the UK. Passed uncut on 23 October 2017 for video.
| 18
|-
|1996
|  From Dusk till Dawn| Banned on 1 May due to its "irresponsible and totally gratuitous" violence, especially in the wake of the then-recent Dunblane and Port Arthur massacres. - revoked on 27 January 2004 for video.
| 18
|-
|1997
|  Crash| Passed with one cut of 35s to sexually explicit dialogue, in the sex scene between James and Catherine where she fantasizes about Vaughn. This was in an attempt to dissuade the distributors from releasing it on video, as they'd have to prepare a specially cut Irish version at high expense for a small market. It didn't work.
| 18
|-
|1997
|  Preaching to the Perverted| Banned for cinema on 28 October and later on video – the trailer caused a mass recall of Donnie Brasco's rental video (which had been passed as an 18), due to having not been classified. 3,300 copies were withdrawn and replaced, with a potential fine of €1000 to stores providing it.
|
|-
|1997
|  Retroactive| Banned for video as prohibition order #97 - revoked on 20 November 1997.
|18
|-
| 1999
| Freaks| Banned for video as prohibition order #134 on 7 February 1999, for being "grossly offensive to disabled people", according to then-assistant censor (and current director) Ger Connolly.
|
|-
| 1999
|  Romance| Still banned.
|
|-
| 1999
|  From Dusk Till Dawn 2: Texas Blood Money| Presumably banned upon release - revoked on 16 November 2004 for video.
|18
|-
| 1999
|  The Idiots| Banned for video in October, no doubt due to unsimulated sexual content showing an erection and vaginal penetration.
|
|-
| 2000
|  Of Freaks and Men| Banned for video due to sadistic scenes of sexual humiliation.
|
|-
| 2001
|  WWF Wrestlemania 16| Banned on video due to the use of realistic weapons, including metal chairs, timber wrapped with barbed wire, shinai and sledgehammers. Deputy censor Audrey Conlon also cited the "gladitorial bloodlust" of the crowd baying for increasingly extreme violence.

Clear Vision Ltd. lodged an appeal (the result of which is unknown) and claimed that "our fans love the wild soap opera element", but the IFCO countered this by stating, "This is one of the most dangerous and pernicious aspects of the entire business. The universal distinguishing feature of all soap opera is that the story lines are regularly made more explicit and, in many instances, more violent, simply to keep audience share.
|
|-
| 2002
|  Cradle of Fear| Banned on 28 March for video.
|
|-
| 2002
|  Riki-Oh: The Story of Ricky| Banned on 28 March for video.
|
|-
| 2002
|  For Your Pleasure| Banned on 28 March for video.
|
|-
| 2002
|  Turkish Delight| Banned on 26 August for video.
|
|-
| 2002
|  The Pornographer| Banned on 30 September for video. The censored UK version was submitted, which had already removed 12s showing ejaculation for a BBFC 18 certificate.
|
|-
| 2002
|  Baise-moi| Banned on 28 November for video – the decision was upheld by the Films Appeal Board. Released theatrically in the summer of 2002, but only on a club basis at the IFI, where admission is restricted to members and guests of 18 years and over.
|
|-
| 2003
|  Man Bites Dog| Banned on 20 March for video.
|
|-
| 2003
|  Spun| Banned on 8 July under Section 7 (2) of the Censorship of Films Act, 1923. According to Kelleher, he didn't object to the content and only banned it to showcase a legal anomaly, meaning that video and cinema releases of the same work automatically got the same rating. He knew the ban would be reversed and the law was changed soon after. Overturned by the Films Appeal Board on 21 July.
|18
|-
| 2005
| Boy Eats Girl|Banned for containing an 'ostensible' but graphic suicide attempt. The decision was reversed on 25 July.
| 15A (theatrical)
18 (video)
|-
| 2005
|  Deep Throat|The uncut version was banned on 13 September for video. A censored version was passed '18' as in the UK (where the uncut version got an 'R18', meaning it could only be bought in licensed sex shops) – all hardcore scenes were re-framed.

As in the UK, the accompanying documentary Inside Deep Throat was passed 18 uncut (for cinema and video) due to the explicit sexual images appearing in a documentary context. The uncut, R18 version of the film itself was only screened in the UK on a double bill with Inside... "merely to put the documentary into context", according to a spokespersion for distributor Momentum Pictures.
| 18 (censored)
|}

 Film ratings 
Eight film rating categories exist, although a film may have been re-rated by the time of its video/DVD release.

There are three former categories no longer in use:

The G, PG and 18 certifications have the same principles on video, but some 18s films may be denied a video release certificate.

Films which are banned and do not have an appeal lodged, or which fail on appeal, have an enforcement noticed published in Iris Oifigiúil, the state's journal. The most recent enforcement notice, appeared on 20 September 2005 journal, and was the first of the year. Revocation notices are also published in the journal, where a film has been banned and then allowed. The 2010 DVD release of the 1978 film I Spit on Your Grave is the most recent instance of an IFCO ban.

 Differences between jurisdictions 
Ratings usually match those of the UK's film classification body, or are one level higher or lower, but rare disparities spanning two or three ratings do exist:

Examples of variances include the 1932 film Scarface, which was given a "15"s rating in the UK (due to "strong language and violence") and a "PG" rating in Ireland. The reverse was the case for the 1968 film Romeo and Juliet, which was rated "PG" in the UK, but "15s" in Ireland.

The 1990 film Rocky V was rated "PG" in the UK (noted for its "moderate violence and mild language"), but a "15" certificate in Ireland. Upon original release, Sheamus Smith objected to the "extreme violence" of the final street fight. UIP appealed for an "Under 12's accompanied" certificate, which was unanimously vetoed.

The 1996 historical drama Michael Collins received a "15" cert in the UK (owing to "strong violence, strong language"), but a lower "PG" rating in Ireland. In what was described as an "unprecedented move", the Irish censor stated that the film was a "landmark in Irish cinema" and that the film should be "available to the widest possible Irish cinema audience".

While the 1999 film The Cider House Rules was rated "12"s in the UK (noted for its "dramatic themes and one brief sex scene"), it received an "18"s cert in Ireland (noted for "themes of abortion, incest and drugs"). Head video censor Audrey Conlon advocated a 15 certificate on the basis that abortion was an important subject for that age group to discuss. Smith, however, felt the matter-of-fact" treatment of abortion was inappropriate given the then-current context of the subject in the country.

 Exceptions 
The restrictions applied to commercial cinemas did not apply to film clubs. The Irish Film Theatre (1977–1984), its predecessor, the Irish Film Society and its successor, the Irish Film Institute, specialised for decades in showing arthouse films that were uncut because films shown privately were not required to be examined by the Censor's Office. The National Film Institute (later Irish Film Institute) had originally been set up to comply with the 1939 encyclical Vigilanti Cura. At one time this gave rise to a legal anomaly where the 35 mm prints of a particular film would to be required to have any "cuts" mandated by the Film Censors Office whereas the 16 mm prints were not, on the erroneous belief that all 16 mm prints were destined for private film clubs. In practice, some commercial cinemas in smaller towns as well as "travelling cinemas" (often showing films in village halls owned by the Catholic Church) were only equipped to show the 16 mm prints. The closure of virtually all of these smaller cinemas (owing to the rising popularity of television and video) has meant that nowadays the only places showing these 16 mm prints are bona fide'' film clubs.

See also 
 Censorship in the Republic of Ireland
 Kevin Rockett, an Irish film historian

References

External links 
 Irish Film Classification Office
 Irish Film Censors' Records – Trinity College Dublin

Legislation links
 Censorship of Films Act, 1923
 Censorship of Films (Amendment) Act, 1925
 The Censorship of Films (Exhibition of Censor's Certificate) Regulations, 1926
 Censorship of Films (Amendment) Act, 1930
 Censorship Of Films (No. 1) Order, 1930
 Censorship of Films (Amendment) Act, 1970
 Video Recordings Act, 1989
 Censorship of Films (Amendment) Act, 1992

Censorship in the Republic of Ireland
Cinema of the Republic of Ireland
Republic of Ireland